RPG Maker, known in Japan as , is a series of programs for the development of role-playing video games (RPGs) with story-driven elements, created by the Japanese group ASCII, succeeded by Enterbrain. The Japanese name, Tsukūru, is a pun mixing the Japanese word tsukuru (作る), means "make" or "create", with tsūru (ツール), the Japanese transcription of the English word "tool".

The RPG Maker series was originally released primarily in Japan, but people started to translate and release the software illegally in China, Taiwan, South Korea, Russia, and North America with RPG Maker 2000 and RPG Maker 2003. Most of the later engines have been officially translated.

PC versions 
RPG Maker is a program that allows users to create their own role-playing video games. Most versions include a tile set based map editor (tilesets are called chipsets in pre-XP versions), a simple scripting language for scripting events, and a battle editor. All versions include initial premade tilesets, characters, and events which can be used in creating new games. One feature of the PC versions of RPG Maker programs is that a user can create new tilesets and characters, and add any new graphics the user wants.

Despite being geared towards creating role-playing video games, the engine also has the capability to create games of other genres, such as adventure games (see Yume Nikki), story-driven games or visual novels with minimal tweaking. Some video games made in RPG Maker engine (See Super Columbine Massacre RPG! and Heartbeat) garnered controversy by many audiences.

RPG Tsukūru Dante 98 
According to Enterbrain, RPG Tsukūru Dante 98, released on December 17, 1992, was the first software of the RPG Maker series, although there were a few versions of RPG making software by ASCII preceding it, dating back to 1988. This, along with its follow-up RPG Tsukūru Dante 98 II, was made for NEC PC-9801, and games created with these programs can be played on a Windows computer with emulators called Dante for Windows and D2win, respectively. RPG Maker was a product that came from various programs that ASCII Corporation had included in ASCII along with other users' code submitted to it, which the company decided to expand and publish into the standalone game-making toolkit.

RPG Maker 95 

RPG Maker 95 was the first Microsoft Windows-based RPG Maker software. Despite being an early version, RPG Maker 95 has both a higher screen resolution, and higher sprite and tile resolution than the several following versions.

RPG Maker 2000 

RPG Maker 2000, also referred to as RM2k, was the second release of RPG Maker for Microsoft Windows and is the most popular and used RPG Maker so far. While it is possible to do more with RM2k, it uses lower resolution sprites and tiles than RPG Maker 95. However, it does not have a noticeable limit of 'sprites'. Unlike RM95, which can only use one 'set', RM2k can use an unlimited number of sprite sheets with specific sizes for each type.  The tilesets also have a similar non-limitation. However, because tiles must be entered into a database, there is a limit on tiles.  This limit however is rarely a problem (normally 5000), and even when it is, an unofficial patch exists which can bump most limits much higher at the risk of potential game corruption. It doesn't support text output and can program only 2 buttons, Z and X. There is text in dialog boxes, by manner of overlaying sprites, or maps lain with text. But not plainly on the screen.

RPG Maker 2003 

RPG Maker 2003, also referred to as RM2k3, and sometimes RM2k/3, is largely an improvement of RM2k. RM2k games can be ported to RM2k3 (but not back to RM2k, the conversion is permanent), and most resources are interchangeable.  The main difference is the introduction of a side-view battle system similar to that found in the Final Fantasy games on the Super NES and the Sony PlayStation. This was the first version made by Enterbrain, which had previously been a part of ASCII.

RPG Maker XP 
RPG Maker XP (also referred to as RMXP) was released 16 September 2005. It is the first RPG Maker which can use Ruby, making it far more powerful than previous versions programming-wise. However, many normal, simplified features present in RM2k(3) have been removed. Most of these features, however, have been programmed with Ruby, and distributed online. RMXP runs at 1024x768 resolution (though games made in it run at 640x480), while offering four times the playable area of its predecessors. By default, games ran at 40 frames per second, though the game's scripts can be modified to set the framerate to any value. Additionally, it allows greater user control over sprite size (there is no specific image size regulation for sprite sheets) and other aspects of game design. This more open-ended arrangement, coupled with the inclusion of the Ruby Game Scripting System, makes RPG Maker XP more versatile than older versions in the series, at the cost of a steeper learning curve. This was named after Windows XP which was active from 2001-2008.

RPG Maker VX 

RPG Maker VX, also referred to as RMVX, its Japanese release date was Dec. 27 2007, and official release date in America was February 29, 2008. In this new maker, the interface is more user-friendly, allowing new users to create games with ease. The framerate was increased to 60 frames per second, providing much smoother animation in comparison to RMXP's often-choppy 40fps. The programming language Ruby is still implemented, and the game's default programming has been overhauled to allow more freedom to those scripting in new features. New editor and a new RTP are included, this time in a much simpler "blocky" style. The default battle system is comparable to that of the Dragon Quest series or its predecessor RM2k, with a frontal view of the battlefield and detailed text descriptions of each action taken. One notable disadvantage from the previous version, however, is the lack of support for multiple tilesets when mapping, leaving the player with only a finite number of unique tiles with which to depict all the game's environments. Multiple player-made workarounds exist, but this remains a sore point among many RMVX users.

RPG Maker VX Ace 

RPG Maker VX Ace, also known as VXAce or simply "Ace", was released by Enterbrain in Japan on December 15, 2011. It was released in the United States on March 15, 2012 as a digital download. It was later made available through Steam, and is also now available as a physical CD. RPG Maker VX Ace is essentially an overhauled version of RPG Maker VX, and removes the issue with multiple tilesets. Battle backgrounds were re-introduced, and are separated into top and bottom halves. Spells, skills, and items can all now have their own damage and recovery formulas, although a quick calculation method reminiscent of the older RPG Makers is available. The VX RTP was redesigned for VX Ace, and a new soundtrack featuring higher quality techno-pop tracks was included. With VX Ace came a large quantity of DLC Resource Packages offered by Enterbrain, also available through Steam.

RPG Maker MV 
Released by Degica on October 23, 2015, RPG Maker MV includes a large number of changes over previous versions, having multiplatform support, side-view battles, and high resolution features. It is the first engine in the series to use JavaScript instead of Ruby, with the addition of plugins. Completed games can be played on PC and mobile devices. RPG Maker MV also goes back to layered tilesets, a feature that was removed in RPG Maker VX and VX Ace. However, unlike RPG Maker XP which allowed users to manually choose which layers to build on, RPG Maker MV automatically stacks tiles on top of other tiles. It also came out on consoles under the name RPG Tsukūru MV Trinity. It was originally announced to only be on PlayStation 4 and Nintendo Switch but was later announced to also be on Xbox One. This release was later cancelled. It was released on Nintendo Switch and PlayStation 4 in Japan on November 15, 2018, and is scheduled for release in North America on September 8, 2020, and Europe on September 11, 2020.

RPG Maker MZ 
RPG Maker MZ was announced in June 2020. RPG Maker MZ is the successor of RPG Maker MV. The first trailer received mixed reviews, critics highlighting its similarity with RPG Maker MV. MZ new updates include the Effekseer particle system, autosave function and XP-style autolayer mechanics, which many users have requested in the past. It released worldwide on August 20, 2020. Like MV, it allows users to develop plugins using JavaScript. Since its release, RPG Maker MZ received mostly positive reviews from users, who praised the return of the layer mechanics from XP, and the augmented features; though similarities to previous engine, RPG Maker MV, drew mixed response similar to the first trailer.

RPG Maker Unite 
In 2022 RPG Maker Unite was announced as an asset for the Unity game engine based on RPG Maker.

Console versions

RPG Tsukūru Super Dante 

Victor Reetz created the first console RPG Maker, RPG Tsukūru Super Dante, which debuted in 1995 for the Super Famicom, as a port of RPG Tsukūru Dante 98. RPG Tsukūru Super Dante was later broadcast via the Super Famicom's Satellaview accessory.

RPG Maker GB is the first console portable version of RPG Maker.

RPG Maker 

In 2000, RPG Maker was released for the Sony PlayStation, however, only a limited number of copies were made for releases outside of Japan. The software allowed user-made characters, and monsters through Anime Maker which was separate from the RPG Maker, which required saving to an external memory card. However, there was a limit to how many user-made sprites and monsters could be used in RPG Maker. Also, in Anime Maker, the user could create larger sprites for a theater-type visual novel in which the player could animate and control characters, but these sprites were much larger and unusable in RPG Maker.

The RPG Maker interface was somewhat user-friendly, and battles were front-view style only. Item, Monster, Skill/Magic, and Dungeons had a small limit cap, as did the effects of any given Item, Magic or Skill (9,999). Items were all inclusive; Weapons and Armors were created in the Items interface. The types of items were as follows: None (mainly used for Key Items), Weapon, Armor, Key (up to eight sub types), Magic (for binding Magic created in the Magic interface to an item), Healing, and Food (which raises stats and EXP, or experience points in which this particular software is the only one of the series to do so natively).

Events were a separate save file from the System file, and are referred to as Scenario files. This is how the user could make multiple parts to one game, provided the user had enough memory cards and card space to create the files.

RPG Maker Fes 
A version for the Nintendo 3DS was released by NIS America on June 27, 2017. While it remains portable on a small screen, users can create games on-the-go and also download games to play as well. The game received some criticism, with NintendoWorldReport writing that "Ultimately, it’s hard for me to recommend RPG Maker Fes to anyone but the most hardcore of RPG fans that have always dreamed of creating their own game."  Games completed can be uploaded to the RPG Maker Fes Player app for those to download and play on their own systems. It is the second RPG Maker to receive a limited edition (the previous one being RPG Tsukūru DS) which includes a CD soundtrack in a jewel case containing all the soundtracks in the game, and a full-color paperback artbook. It is the first RPG Maker on consoles/handhelds to receive a digital release.

English versions 
Historically, few early RPG Maker versions had official English releases. Each Windows version has, however, been subject to unlicensed distribution through the internet in some form or other. RPG Maker 95, as well as translation patches for the Super Famicom titles RPG Maker Super Dante and RPG Maker 2, were translated and distributed by a group called KanjiHack. In 1999, KanjiHack closed upon receiving a cease-and-desist e-mail from ASCII's lawyers. RPG Maker 95 was re-released with a more complete translation under the name RPG Maker 95+ by a Russian programmer, under the alias of Don Miguel, who later translated and released RPG Maker 2000. Later versions, RPG Maker 2003, and RPG Maker XP, were similarly translated and distributed by a programmer under the alias of RPG Advocate.

The first official English release of the PC series was of RPG Maker XP on September 16, 2005. The next two versions of the software, RPG Maker VX and RPG Maker VX Ace both received official English releases. Since 2010 English versions of RPG Maker have been published by Degica, who have also officially released English versions of the older titles RPG Maker 2000 and RPG Maker 2003.

The first official English language of a console version was the PlayStation version in 2000, simply called RPG Maker, by Agetec. Agetec also localized RPG Maker 2 and RPG Maker 3.

Reception and legacy 
By August 2005, the series had sold more than two million copies worldwide. Later Steam releases are estimated to have sold nearly 1million units by April 2018, according to Steam Spy. Since its first release, the series has been used to create numerous titles, both free and commercial. According to PC Gamer, it has become "the go-to tool for aspiring developers who want to make a game and sell it", due to being "the most accessible game engine around". In addition to games, the series has been used for other purposes, such as studies involving students learning mathematics through the creation of role-playing games, and programming.

With the release of 2012 video game Ib, it has been credited with helping popularize its engine's use in developing more story-driven and horror games than role-playing games.

Some RPG Maker video games received critical acclaim, and later adapted into multimedia franchises only produced in Japan including Angels of Death, Ao Oni and Corpse Party.

Ledonne producing a documentary in 2008 called Playing Columbine about his game and its impact.

RPG Maker as a machinima form 

RPG Maker engine still often use for films as machinima form, rather than making video games, is extremely rare. For example: Distortion (2023) is a first feature-length experimental non-narrative animated film using the RPG Maker MV engine, released exclusively on YouTube. Short films and series made in RPG Maker engine such as Decisive Destiny (2018), Yanzilla (2019), and Teenagers in Chester Street (2021), the latter who also created Distortion.

RPG Maker series timeline

Notable games 

A number of developers who have created notable games via RPG Maker include:

See also 
Fighter Maker
Game Maker
Sim RPG Maker
Sound Novel Tsukūru
RPG creation software

References

External links

 
1992 software
Video game IDE
Video game engines
PlayStation (console) games
PlayStation 2 games
Satellaview games
Kadokawa Dwango franchises
Windows software
Top-down video games
Xbox One games